Bushiri  is an administrative ward in Pangani District of Tanga Region in Tanzania. According to the 2012 census, the ward has a total population of 4,750. It is named in honor of Abushiri, a freedom fighter who led a revolt against the German colonizers of East Africa in 1888.

See also
 Abushiri revolt

References

African resistance to colonialism
1888 in German East Africa
Wards of Pangani District
Wards of Tanga Region